The Somalia national basketball team is the national basketball team of Somalia. It is a member of the International Basketball Federation (FIBA) and is governed by the Somali Basketball Federation.

Administration
As of April 2014, Nur Mohamed Abdullahi serves as the president of the Somalia Basketball Federation. Sadak Abdulkadir  is the Secretary General. The captain of the team is Yusuf Qaafow.

History
The Somalia Basketball Federation became affiliated with FIBA in 1960. It is part of the executive board of the Arab Basketball Confederation.

Although the national basketball squad has yet to pass the qualification stages of the FIBA World Championship, it won a bronze medal at the 1981 FIBA Africa Championship, when Somalia hosted the tournament. The team also participates in the basketball event at the Pan Arab Games.

Roster

Competitive record

AfroBasket
Somalia has played in five AfroBasket tournaments, with its best result being the bronze medal in 1981 when the country hosted the tournament. Since 1985, Somalia has been absent from the tournament, although it has played in all qualifying rounds since 2015.

African Games

1965-1978 : Did not qualify
1987 : ?
1991-2015 : Did not qualify
2019 : To be determined

Islamic Solidarity Games

2005 : 17th
2013 : Did not participate

Past rosters
Team for AfroBasket 2013 qualification

Team for AfroBasket 2015 qualification

See also
 Sports in Somalia
 Somalia national under-19 basketball team
 Somalia women's national basketball team

References

External links
Somali Basketball Federation
Presentation at FIBA Website
Somalia Basketball Records at FIBA Archive
FIBA Africa – Somalia Men National Team
Somali National Basketball Team – Presentation on Facebook

Videos
Zone V Hoops Tourney: Uganda Silverbacks bounce back to defeat Somalia 85-74 Youtube.com video

Basketball in Somalia
Basketball teams in Somalia
Men's national basketball teams
Basketball
1960 establishments in Somalia